The Last Dream (Italian:L'ultimo sogno) is a 1921 Italian silent film directed by Roberto Roberti and starring Francesca Bertini.

Cast
 Francesca Bertini 
 Giorgio Bonaiti 
 Raoul Maillard 
 Mario Parpagnoli 
 Bianca Renieri 
 Marcella Sabbatini

References

Bibliography
 Cristina Jandelli. Le dive italiane del cinema muto. L'epos, 2006.

External links

 (the film is listed twice)

1921 films
1920s Italian-language films
Films directed by Roberto Roberti
Italian silent feature films
Italian black-and-white films